Karanga may refer to:

 Karanga (district), Mangaia, Cook Islands
 Karanga (Māori culture), an element of Māori cultural protocol, the calling of visitors onto a marae
 Karanga (Moshi Urban Ward), Old Moshi, Kilimanjaro Region, Tanzania
 Karanga Chhota (village), a village in India
 Karanga language, a Nilo-Saharan language spoken in Chad
 Karanga people, a southern Bantu ethnic group
 Karanga dialect
 Ikalanga language, a Bantu language spoken in Botswana and Zimbabwe.
Karanga is a beautiful village in Jorhat, Assam ,India.